Richard Thieme (born 1944), is a former priest who became a commentator on technology and culture, founding the consulting firm ThiemeWorks. He is a frequent keynote speaker at government agencies and technology conferences around the world, routinely drawing large audiences, and is described as an "institution" and "father figure" in the hacker convention circuit. He is the author of the syndicated column "Islands in the Clickstream", which was published in 60 countries and in 2004 was turned into a book of the same name. In 2010 he published a book of short stories, Mind Games, and in 2012 he contributed to the peer-reviewed academic work, UFOs and Government, a Historical Inquiry. He has written for multiple publications including Wired, Forbes, and Salon.com. Andrew Briney, editor-in-chief of Information Security magazine, describes Thieme as "a living symbol of the human dimension of technology".

Biography

Early life and academic career
Thieme was born in Chicago, with one of his parents Christian and one Jewish, and one older brother, Art. Raised Jewish, Thieme was confirmed as a young man in a Reform synagogue, and attended Lake View High School, graduating in 1961. As a teenager he began writing science fiction, with his first story, "Pleasant Journey", published by Joseph Campbell in Analog science fiction magazine in 1963, when Thieme was 19. Thieme studied English literature at Northwestern University, graduating Phi Beta Kappa and receiving his B.A. in 1965, and also marrying and starting a family. In 1967, he earned an M.A. in English at the University of Chicago. For the next five years he taught literature at the University of Illinois - Chicago Circle campus, after which he moved to England for two years. There, at age 30, he converted to the Anglican church.

Episcopal priest
When Thieme and his wife returned to the United States in the 1970s, they moved to Evanston, Illinois, where Thieme attended Seabury-Western Theological Seminary to earn his Masters of Divinity degree, and he became an Episcopal priest. His wife Anne was ordained in May 1978, the first woman to be ordained an Episcopal priest in Utah. The Thiemes were co-rectors at St. James Episcopal Church in Midvale, Utah, but divorced in 1981. Richard remained as rector in the parish until 1984, then transferred to become rector at the Holy Innocents church in Hawaii (1984–1987), and St. Paul's Episcopal Church in Milwaukee (1987–1993). He married his second (and current) wife Shirley in 1983, merging their respective families to have a total of seven children.

Technology commentator and author
In the early 1980s Thieme became acquainted with computers, at first interested in how they could apply to spirituality and religious organizations. While still in the priesthood, he began writing about technology and culture, including the spiritual dimension of technology, for example in his essay "Computer applications for spirituality, the transformation of religious experience." In 1993 Thieme left the priesthood to pursue a full-time career of professional speaking and writing, founding his own company, LifeWorks (changed in 1996 to ThiemeWorks), and working with clients such as Arthur Andersen, Allstate Insurance, General Electric, the National Security Agency, Microsoft, and the United States Department of the Treasury.

In the mid-1990s, Thieme started writing a monthly online column, "Islands in the Clickstream". It began as emails and then grew into a mailing list, website, and syndicated column. Thieme gained a reputation as an "online pundit of hacker culture." In 2004 a collection of 144 of his essays were published in the book Islands in the Clickstream.

Regarded as a member of the "cyber avant-garde", Thieme has spoken for nearly two decades, since the mid-1990s, at the Def Con and Blackhat Briefings security conferences, focusing on the impact of new technologies on individuals and organizational structures, with an emphasis on security and intelligence, and he has become somewhat of a "father figure" to many in the hacker subculture.

In 2010, Thieme published Mind Games, which collected the various works of fiction he'd published in different locations into one place. In 2012, he contributed to the non-fiction book UFOs and Government: A Historical Inquiry, which examines the government's treatment of UFO reports, going back to World War II. The book was praised by the magazine Choice: Current Reviews for Academic Libraries for good sourcing, and recommended as "a useful resource for the study of a controversial topic".

Works
 Nonfiction books
 
 (contributor) 

 Selected fiction
 

 
 

 Contributed chapters
 
 
The Changing Context of Intelligence and Ethics: Enabling Technologies as Transformational Engines in the proceedings of the New Paradigms for Security Workshop (2008) and in the Ethical Spectacle (spectacle.org) as "Changing Contexts of Security and Ethics: You Can’t Have One Without the Other"

 Selected articles
 In Search of the Grail Wired Magazine, issue 3.07, July 1995
 Bladerunner future view Everything Toronto NOW, 1997
 Dreams Engineers Have CMC Magazine, January 1997
 Prime Time for Hackers is Over Salon.com, October 17, 1998
 
 Review of the Kevin Kelly's Out of Control  Enculturation 3.1, Spring 2000
 The Face we See in the Digital Mirror: How Technology is Changing Religion National Catholic Reporter, February 11, 2005

 Selected keynotes
 The Symbiotic Relationship Between Networked Computers and Humans -- A Dialectic Constituting a Rising Spiral of Mutual Transformation. Def Con, 1996
 Convergence -- Every Man (and Woman) a Spy., Black Hat Briefings, 1998
 The More Things Change The More They Don't: Soft Destruction and the Ancient Wisdom of Hacking, Def Con, 1998
 Social Engineering at Def Con:  Games Hackers Play, Def Con, 2000
 "Hacking and Cycles of Truths, Half-Truths and Boldfaced Lies", Rubi Con, 2000
 Hacking a Trans-Planetary Net: The Essence of Hacking in a Context of Pan-global Culture, the Wetware / dryware Interface, and Going to Europa., Def Con, 2001
 The Truth About Life, Hacking and the Truth (about Life, Hacking and the Truth) ((about Life, Hacking and...)) Rubi-Con, 2002
 Hacker Generations: From Building the Network to Using the Network to Being the Network, Def Con, 2003
 Quantum Hacking: In Search of a Unified Theory, Def Con, 2004
 Zen and The Relevance of Perception to Cyber Security, or, When is a Network Not a Network?, Shmoocon, 2005
 Living on the Edge: The Sources of Creativity for Security Wizards and Hackers, Notacon, 2005
 Staring into the Abyss: The Dark Side of Security and Professional Intelligence, Black Hat Briefings, 2011

References

External links
 www.thiemeworks.com Richard Thieme's official website
 Interview with Bruce Schneier conducted by Richard Thieme (Originally in Information Security Magazine, June 2000)
 ZDNet Australia Video interview conducted by Munir Kotadia at AusCERT 2007
 
 

1944 births
Living people
American Episcopal priests
Writers from Chicago
American technology writers
Northwestern University alumni
University of Chicago alumni